Thomas Blair Nicholson (born August 23, 1979) is a baseball coach and former infielder, who is the baseball head coach of the UC Davis Aggies. He played college baseball at Texas from 1998 to 2000 for head coach Augie Garrido.

Playing career
Nicholson went to Esperanza High School in Anaheim, California, where he played shortstop. As a senior he hit .456 with 7 homeruns and 46 RBI.

Nicholson attended the University of Texas in Austin, Texas. He was a member of the Texas Longhorns baseball team that played in the 2000 College World Series.

He would be selected in the 11th round of the 2000 Major League Baseball draft by the Chicago White Sox. Nicholson would spend 6 years in Minor League Baseball for the White Sox and Colorado Rockies's organizations.

Coaching career
Nicholson joined the coaching staff of the Longhorns in 2009 as a volunteer assistant. He returned in the same role in 2010. For the 2011 and 2012 seasons, Nicholson was named the hitting and infield coach at Sacramento State where he helped tutor Rhys Hoskins. In the summer of 2012, Nicholson returned to Austin, to join Garrido's coaching staff as hitting and infield coach. Nicholson returned to Sacramento State in 2017, before joining the coaching staff of the Stanford Cardinal in 2018.

On December 13, 2021, Nicholson was named the head baseball coach of the UC Davis Aggies.

Head coaching record

References

External links

UC Davis Aggies bio

Living people
1979 births
Birmingham Barons players
Burlington Bees players
Charlotte Knights players
Colorado Springs Sky Sox players
Tulsa Drillers players
Sacramento State Hornets baseball coaches
Stanford Cardinal baseball coaches
Texas Longhorns baseball coaches
Texas Longhorns baseball players
UC Davis Aggies baseball coaches
Winston-Salem Warthogs players